The 72nd Regiment Illinois Volunteer Infantry, known as the "First Chicago Board of Trade Regiment" was an infantry regiment that served in the Union Army during the American Civil War.

Service
72nd Regiment Illinois  was organized at Chicago, Illinois and mustered into Federal service on August 23, 1862.

The regiment was discharged from service on August 7, 1865.

Total strength and casualties
The regiment suffered 7 officers and 79 enlisted men who were killed in action or mortally wounded and 3 officers and 145 enlisted men who died of disease, for a total of 234 fatalities.

Commanders
 Colonel Frederick Augustus Starring - Mustered out with the regiment.

See also
List of Illinois Civil War Units
Illinois in the American Civil War

Notes

References
The Civil War Archive

Units and formations of the Union Army from Illinois
1862 establishments in Illinois
Military units and formations established in 1862
Military units and formations disestablished in 1865